Omnipol is a company based in Prague, Czech Republic, specialising in the trading of defence and aerospace equipment.

International sales
Omnipol acts as the intermediary in government-to-government sales of defence equipment, supplying air and ground forces in more than 60 countries.

Possible connections to Lockerbie bombing
From 1975-1981, roughly 700 tons of Semtex plastic explosive were purchased and exported to Libya by Omnipol. As such, implications have been drawn that Semtex usage on the part of militant factions, such as the Irish Republican Army and the Palestine Liberation Organization, may have been originally sourced from Omnipol, given Libyan ties to such groups. Notably, it has been alleged that the Semtex utilized to carry out the 1988 bombing of Pan Am Flight 103 over Lockerbie, Scotland was indirectly sourced from Omnipol via Libya, which, though not entirely substantiated or corroborated, is consistent with verifiable records of Omnipol's arms sale connections to Libya.

Acquisitions 
In April 2022, it was announced that Omnipol had acquired the Russian-owned aerospace company, Aircraft Industries.

References

External links
Omnipol website

Companies of Czechoslovakia
Defence companies of the Czech Republic
Pan Am Flight 103